Caroline Ada Seville (1874–1955) was a notable New Zealand nurse, hospital matron and community leader . She was born in Birmingham, England in 1874.

References

1874 births
1955 deaths
New Zealand nurses
English emigrants to New Zealand
People from Birmingham, West Midlands
New Zealand women nurses